This list of universities in Sweden is based on the Higher Education Ordinance of 1993 (as amended until January 2006). With few exceptions, all higher education in Sweden is publicly funded.

The Swedish higher education system differentiates between universitet and högskola (university and university college respectively). The universities are research-oriented and may award Bachelor's, Master's, and Doctor's degrees in many academic fields, whereas the högskolor usually are more focused on applied sciences, and only have limited rights granting doctor's degrees. Note, however, that some universities still call themselves högskola in Swedish, mainly older specialised institutions in engineering and medicine (for instance KTH Royal Institute of Technology is called "Kungliga Tekniska Högskolan" and Chalmers University of Technology is called "Chalmers Tekniska Högskola"). Also, both proper universities and högskolor translate their official names to "university" in English, where in the latter case "university college" would be more correct.

Public universities
The order of precedence is based on their year of establishment as a university. Only Uppsala University (est. 1477) and Lund University (est. 1666) were actually founded as universities, whereas all the other universities were raised from högskola (university college) status to the higher university status after they had been founded.

Two universities founded under Swedish rule, the University of Tartu from 1632 (now in Estonia) and the Royal Academy of Turku from 1640 (later established as University of Helsinki, now in Finland), as well as the University of Greifswald from 1456 (now in Germany but a fief held by Sweden 1631–1806, Swedish 1806–1815), are excluded from the list.

Växjö University (1967-2009) was a university that has now merged with Kalmar University (1977-2009), becoming the Linnaeus University in 2010.

Public university colleges
A Högskola (= university college or college in English) is an institution of higher education, similar to a university but typically smaller. Unlike a full university, a högskola has limitations in awarding doctoral degrees (PhD). The Swedish government has granted the right to some högskola to award PhDs in some specific fields. Most of the 'högskola' have agreements with bigger universities to conduct joint doctoral programs. The public 'högskola' are:

 Gotland University College (1998 - 2013) was a "högskola" that has now merged with Uppsala university, becoming the Gotland campus of Uppsala university.
 Kalmar University (1977-2009) was a "högskola" that has now merged with Växjö University (1967-2009), becoming the Linnaeus University in 2010.

Private universities and högskolor
There are seven private institutions of higher education with the right to give post graduate degrees, namely Johannelund School of Theology in Uppsala, Chalmers University of Technology in Gothenburg, Stockholm School of Economics and Jönköping University Foundation, Ersta Sköndal Bräcke University College, Sophiahemmet University College and University College Stockholm (Enskilda Högskolan Stockholm).

Recognised higher education institutions

ARWU
Ranking list according to the Academic Ranking of World Universities:

In relation to their population size, Switzerland (first) and Sweden (second) are the two countries with the highest number of universities among the 100 best of the Academic Ranking of World Universities (2014-2015).

QS World
Ranked Swedish universities on QS World University Rankings (with the highest ranked for that year marked in blue):

THE World
Ranked Swedish institutes on Times Higher Education World University Rankings (with the highest ranked for that year marked in blue):

THE-QS
Ranking list according to the THE–QS World University Rankings (with the highest ranked for that year marked in blue):

See also
Education in Sweden
Swedish National Agency for Higher Education, Swedish National Board of Student Aid
Swedish Research Council
Swedish Scholastic Aptitude Test
 Open access in Sweden
List of universities and colleges by country

Notes and references

External links
Swedish National Agency for Higher Education
Study in Sweden
Programme and course portal for Swedish universities & colleges

 
Universities
Sweden
Sweden